Sphenomorphus darlingtoni is a species of skink, a lizard in the family Scincidae. The species is endemic to Papua New Guinea.

Etymology
The specific name, darlingtoni, is in honor of American entomologist Philip Jackson Darlington Jr.

Common name
S. darlingtoni is known as mamng in the Kalam language of Papua New Guinea. This common name is also applied to plants of the genus Begonia.

Behavior and habitat
The Kalam people of Papua New Guinea describe S. darlingtoni as a slow-moving lizard that does not escape when caught, and also does not bask in the sun. It prefers damp habitats and is often found in areas of Ischaemum polystachyum grass.

Reproduction
S. darlingtoni is oviparous.

References

Further reading
Greer AE, Parker F (1967). "A new scincid lizard from the northern Solomon Islands". Breviora (275): 1–20. (Sphenomorphus darlingtoni, new combination, p. 16).
Greer AE, Shea G (2004). "A New Character within the Taxonomically Difficult Sphenomorphus Group of Lygosomine Skinks, with a Description of a New Species from New Guinea". Journal of Herpetology 38 (1): 79–87. 
Loveridge A (1945). "New Scincid Lizards of the Genera Tropodiphorus and Lygosoma from New Guinea". Proceedings of the Biological Society of Washington 58: 47–52. (Tropidophorus darlingtoni, new species, pp. 47–48).

darlingtoni
Skinks of New Guinea
Endemic fauna of New Guinea
Reptiles described in 1945
Taxa named by Arthur Loveridge